Cape Velykyi Fontan (some time translated as Big Fontan, or Great Fontan) is a southern point of the Gulf of Odesa. It is located in the southern part of the city of Odesa.

External links
 Cape Velyky Fontan

Velyky Fontan